Mama Wailer is an album by American jazz organist Lonnie Smith recorded in 1971 and released on the Kudu label.

Reception 

Allmusic's Thom Jurek said: "Mama Wailer is one of the quintessential sides issued by Creed Taylor's CTI/Kudu imprint ... This is what Latin soul is all about when it meets jazz. The improvisations are in the pocket, but, at the same time, off the page. Here is where boogaloo and hard bop meet headlong".

Track listing
All compositions by Lonnie Smith except where noted
 "Mama Wailer" – 6:20
 "Hola Muneca" – 6:32
 "I Feel the Earth Move" (Carole King) – 5:06
 "Stand" (Sylvester Stewart) – 17:27

Personnel
Lonnie Smith – organ, clavinet, vocals
Danny Moore – trumpet, flugelhorn
Grover Washington Jr. – flute, tenor saxophone, arranger
Dave Hubbard – tenor saxophone
Marvin Cabell – tenor saxophone 
George Davis – guitar
Jimmy Ponder – guitar
Robert Lowe – guitar (track 1)
Ron Carter – bass, electric bass (tracks 1, 2 & 4)
Chuck Rainey – bass, electric bass (track 3)
Billy Cobham – drums
William King, Airto Moreira, Richard Pratt – percussion

References

Kudu Records albums
Lonnie Smith (organist) albums
1971 albums
Albums produced by Creed Taylor
Albums recorded at Van Gelder Studio